Forêt Debussy is a 2016 Taiwanese drama film written and directed by Kuo Cheng-chui. Starring Gwei Lun-mei and Lu Yi-ching, the film is about a mother who takes her daughter away from the city to the mountains to help her recover from a traumatic past.

Forêt Debussy world premiered at the 2016 Kaohsiung Film Festival, and was released in theaters on October 28, 2016.

The film's title refers to French composer Claude Debussy, whose compositions were notably inspired by nature.

Premise
Far away from the city area in the mountains, a mother and a daughter live a simple and isolated life. The Daughter used to be a well-known pianist. After her husband and son were murdered for reasons relating to an influence-peddling case, The Daughter fell into despair and becomes indifferent to her surroundings. The Mother then decided to hide her daughter and herself deep in a forest where no one could ever find them, believing it is the only possible way for her daughter to heal herself and survive. However, despite living in seclusion, they can never escape from themselves. In the wilds, their journey has just begun.

Cast
Gwei Lun-mei as The Daughter
Lu Yi-ching as The Mother

Production
The film was partially financed through a production grant from the Ministry of Culture. Filming took place in the mountains of Alishan, Chiayi, Taiwan.

Soundtrack

Awards and nominations

References

External links

 

2016 drama films
2016 films
Taiwanese drama films
Films set in forests
2010s Mandarin-language films
2016 directorial debut films